Bradbray Apartment is an English band originally formed in Stafford, England, in 1987.

Also known by their fans as "The Brads", the band are known for their unique mix of post-punk power along with vintage synths with big catchy choruses and a steady thumping rhythm section. Having separated in late 1989, the band reformed in the summer of 2014 after a local newspaper ran a 25th anniversary piece on their 1989 gig at Covent Garden in London. This prompted the lead singer to get in touch with his old bandmates which led to the reformation.

Band lineup 
Original band lineup in 1987:
Matt Collins, vocals
Jim Allen, keyboards
Bill Scroggs, bass
Scott Sinfield, guitar

1988 
Scott Sinfield, guitar, left the band due to other commitments; replaced by
Steve Follows

1989 
Mark Gear

2014 
Mark Gear, drums, left the band due to other commitments; replaced by
Rob Wild

2018 
Rob Wild, drums; left band late 2017, replaced by
Liam Collins

Recordings and track releases 
Who Needs Einstein EP (Tubecroft Records) September 1989
"Reach for the Sky"
"Running"
"Shadowfall"
"Hollow of the Mind"
recorded at The Cottage recording studio Macclesfield

Theory of Relativity EP (Own Label) April 2016
"Another You"
"Endgame"
"Don't Wanna Lose You"
"Into the Cold"
recorded at Prism recording studio Stoke-on-Trent

References

External links 
Official website

English post-punk music groups
English alternative rock groups
English indie rock groups
Musical groups from Staffordshire